USCGC Rollin Fritch is the US Coast Guard's 19th , and the first to be homeported outside of the Caribbean. She is based at the Coast Guard Training Center in Cape May, New Jersey.

Like her sister ships she was built in the Bollinger Shipyards, in Lockport, Louisiana.  She was delivered for her sea trials on August 23, 2016, and commissioned on November 19, 2016.

Design

She is armed with a 25 mm autocannon, gyro-stabilized, and fired from a sensor equipped remote weapons station on the bridge, supplemented by four crew-served Browning machine guns.

They carry a waterjet-propelled high-speed pursuit boat, deployed and retrieved via a stern launching ramp.  The ramp allows the pursuit boat to be deployed and retrieved without bringing the cutter to a stop.

Operational duty

Rollin Fritch, like her sister ships, is designed for search and rescue, and the interception of smugglers. Her high-speed waterjet-propelled pursuit boat, launched from her stern launching ramp, make her a potent weapon for the interception of smugglers.

Homeported in Cape May

The homeport of Rollin Fritch and her sister ship,  is the Coast Guard Training Center in Cape May. According to the Cape May County Herald local citizens welcome the Coast Guard presence, and its contribution to the local economy.

Namesake

In 2010, Charles "Skip" W. Bowen, who was then the United States Coast Guard's most senior non-commissioned officer, proposed that all 58 cutters in the Sentinel class should be named after enlisted sailors in the Coast Guard, or one of its precursor services, who were recognized for their heroism.  In 2014 the Coast Guard announced that Rollin A. Fritch, a Coast Guard seaman who earned a posthumous Silver Star for his service on the transport  during World War II, would be the namesake of the 19th cutter.  Fritch served as a gunner who was seen bravely firing his anti-aircraft gun at a kamikaze aircraft right up until it struck the bridge where his gun was sited.

References

Sentinel-class cutters
Ships of the United States Coast Guard
2016 ships
Ships built in Lockport, Louisiana